Tanchon South Airport(남단천비행장) is an airport in Hamgyong-namdo, North Korea.

Facilities 
The airfield has a single gravel runway 14/32 measuring 6100 x 75 feet (1859 x 13 m).

References 

Airports in North Korea
South Hamgyong